Graham Hawkes (born 23 December 1947) is a London-born marine engineer and submarine designer. Through the 1980s and 1990s, Hawkes designed 70% of the crewed submersibles produced in those two decades.

Hawkes invented the first robotic machine gun, the Telepresent Rapid Aiming Platform (TRAP), the first weapon he designed. He had been inspired to create a safer way for police to deal with situations after watching a shootout in North Hollywood, Los Angeles on television.

Career
In 1976, in association with OSEL of Great Yarmouth, Hawkes designed the one-atmosphere deep diving suit Wasp. Two years later, he designed the one-man microsubmersible Mantis, which included remote manipulator arms. A Mantis sub was used in the James Bond film "For Your Eyes Only", which he himself piloted in a large tank at the Pinewood Studios

Hawkes founded the San Leandro based firm, Deep Ocean Engineering (DOE), in 1981 with Sylvia Earle, his wife from 1986 to 1992. DOE has produced over 300 ROVs.

By 1982, he had completed the Challenger submersible, capable of diving .

In 1981, he designed the first of the Deep Rover-series of 1- and 2-man submersibles. A Deep Rover submarine was used in the 3-D IMAX film "Aliens of the Deep". In the same year, Hawkes founded Deep Ocean Technology (DOT) with Earle.

An insight into his personality was provided by a scene that occurred during the sea trials of the first Deep Rover vehicle.  Operating near San Nicholas Island, California, from a converted mudboat the R/V Egabrag, the sub had been launched after dark with Hawkes as pilot. He had the descent depth every 100 metres, down to 1000 metres on the Underwater telephone (UQC). Amongst the people on the bridge of the R/V Egabrag, where the UQC was installed were the Captain and helmsman, his then wife Sylvia Earle, a reporter, cameraman and sound man from a San Francisco TV station, the Operations Manager from CANDIVE and the Diving Safety Officer from the University of Rhode Island, Phillip Sharkey.  Hawkes reported, "1000 meters."  There was a quiet ripple of applause on the bridge, and the reporter took the UQC microphone.  He pressed the "push to talk" button and asked Hawkes, "What does it mean to you to be there, at 3000 feet?"  The reporter was clearly expecting the flowery prose that Sylvia Earle was so justly famous for, but all he got from Hawkes was "It means my calculations were correct."

This exploit, in 1985, set the world solo dive depth record in a submarine. (3000 ft/1000m off San Clemente Island on Deep Rover), which was soon repeated by Sylvia Earle, and another team member.

In 1991, he made headlines when it was briefly thought that he and his team might have found the remains of 'Flight 19', missing in the Bermuda Triangle since 1945.

Hawkes left the day-to-day operations of Deep Ocean Engineering to found Hawkes Ocean Technologies (HOT) in 1996. HOT launched the Necker Nymph and DeepFlight Super Falcon which Hawkes designed.

Hawkes completed the design for the Deep Flight II two-person submarine in 1998.

In 2000, he completed the DeepFlight Aviator, the first positively buoyant submersible that relies on hydrodynamic forces on its wings for diving. It was also the first research submersible to attain a speed of 10 mph underwater. The first example of the type is called Spirit of Patrick.

In 2008, Hawkes finished the first example of his design DeepFlight Super Falcon, which he subsequently delivered to venture capitalist Tom Perkins.

In 2010, the first example of his DeepFlight Merlin design was completed and delivered to Richard Branson. It was named the Necker Nymph and is a wet submarine that is positively buoyant and utilizes hydrodynamic forces to dive.

Bibliography
 Cambridge University Press, "Handbook of Phycological Methods", Mark M. Littler, Diane S. Littler, ed.s, 1985,

Filmography

References

External links
 DeepFlight: Graham Hawkes, Founder and Chief Technology Officer
 

1947 births
Living people
Engineers from London
British naval architects
Scientists from the San Francisco Bay Area
British marine engineers